Møstings Hus (Møsting's House) is a small Neoclassical country house now used as an exhibition space in the Frederiksberg district of Copenhagen, Denmark. A pond lies in front of the building.

History

19th century
 
Møsting's House dates from a time when Frederiksberg was the most popular place for wealthy Copenhageners to build their summer residences. The house was originally located at the corner of Smallegade and Falkoner Allé. It was constructed in 180001 for judge in Hod-og Stadsretten Ditlev Frederik Feddersen. The architect is not known.

In 1809, it was acquired by Johan Sigismund von Møsting, probably to a design  by one of Caspar Frederik Harsdorff's students. Møsting succeeded Ernst von Schimmelmann in 1813 and was from 1814 he was a member of Gehejmestatsrådet. Møsting and his family spend their summers in the house until his death in 1843. In 1844, it was sold to decisor-general Georg Hermann Monrad.

20th century
Most of the associated buildings were pulled down in 1901 while the main building was Class A listed following the adoption of the Danish Building Conservation Act in 1918. In 1924, Møsting's House was sold to a company that opened the Rialto Teatret cinema next to it on 1 October that year. In 1958, new owners obtained permission to dismantle Møsting's House to build a larger cinema complex. It was a precondition that the house would later be rebuilt in another location. This happened in 1977.

Today
The building's new address is Andebakkesti 5. The pond in front of the building is the former village pond of Solbjerg. Next to the house is a somewhat similar building from the same period. It now serves as residence for the ephor of Hassagers Kollegium.

Møsting's House is today used as a venue for exhibitions, concerts and literary events.

References

External links

 Official website
 Møstings Hus at arkitekturbilleder.dk
 Drawing in the Danish National Art Library
 Source

Listed buildings and structures in Frederiksberg Municipality
Relocated buildings and structures in Denmark
Neoclassical architecture in Copenhagen